Houssem Dagdoug (born 23 July 1998) is a Tunisian footballer who plays as a defender for Espérance de Tunis.

Honours
CS Sfaxien
Tunisian Cup: 2018–19, 2020–21

References

1998 births
CS Sfaxien players
Espérance Sportive de Tunis players
Tunisian Ligue Professionnelle 1 players
Living people
Tunisian footballers
Association football defenders